Rolf Jørgen Fuglesang (31 January 1909, Fredrikstad – 25 November 1988) was a Norwegian secretary to the Nasjonal Samling government of Vidkun Quisling 1940–1941 and minister 1941–1942 and 1942–1945. He was also President of the  1943–1945.

Fuglesang, educated in law, was from the very beginning, one of Quisling's most loyal followers and played an important role under the establishment of NS and the building of the Nazi administration during the German occupation. In the early stages of the occupation, he was regarded by the Germans as one of their strongholds, among others, due to his focus on Nazi race ideas. Towards the end of the war, however, he was a figurehead of the opposition to the Germans inside NS.

During the legal purge in Norway after World War II, he was sentenced to lifelong imprisonment, but released in 1956.

His daughter was married to art historian Per Jonas Nordhagen, a son of Rolf Nordhagen, for some time.

See also
The Norwegian Ministry of Culture and Enlightenment

References

1909 births
1988 deaths
People from Fredrikstad
Members of Nasjonal Samling
Government ministers of Norway
People convicted of treason for Nazi Germany against Norway
Prisoners sentenced to life imprisonment by Norway
Norwegian prisoners sentenced to life imprisonment
Fascist politicians